Antioch earthquake
115 Antioch earthquake
526 Antioch earthquake